Florence Hall may refer to:

Florence Howe Hall, American author
Florence Hall (WLA), leader of Woman's Land Army of America
Florence Hall (actress) in The Judas Tree (Jonathan Creek)

See also